Chengbei (城北区) is a district of Xining, Qinghai, People's Republic of China (PRC).

Chengbei may also refer to the following locations in the PRC:

Towns 
 Chengbei, Meizhou, in Meijiang District, Meizhou, Guangdong
 Chengbei, Fuchuan County, in Fuchuan Yao Autonomous County, Guangxi
 Chengbei, Jiange County, Sichuan
 Chengbei, Linshui County, Sichuan

Townships 
 Chengbei Township, Anhui, in Jin'an District, Lu'an
 Chengbei Township, Chongqing, in Liangping County
 Chengbei Township, Guangdong, in Xuwen County
 Chengbei Township, Jiangsu, in Hanjiang District, Yangzhou
 Chengbei Township, Anyue County, Sichuan
 Chengbei Township, Zhaojue County, Sichuan
 Chengbei Township, Zhejiang, in Longquan

Subdistricts 
 Chengbei Subdistrict, Beijing, in Changping District, Beijing
 Chengbei Subdistrict, Fu'an, Fujian
 Chengbei Subdistrict, Linxia City, Gansu
 Chengbei Subdistrict, Lianjiang, Guangdong
 Chengbei Subdistrict, Yangjiang, in Jiangcheng District, Yangjiang, Guangdong
 Chengbei Subdistrict, Zhaoqing, in Duanzhou District, Zhaoqing, Guangdong
 Chengbei Subdistrict, Beiliu, Guangxi
 Chengbei Subdistrict, Laibin, in Xingbin District, Laibin, Guangxi
 Chengbei Subdistrict, Wuzhou, in Wanxiu District, Wuzhou, Guangxi
 Chengbei Subdistrict, Yulin, Guangxi, in Yuzhou District, Yulin, Guangxi
 Chengbei Subdistrict, Xingren County, Guizhou
 Chengbei Subdistrict, Zhoukou, in Chuanhui District, Zhoukou, Henan
 Chengbei Subdistrict, Yingcheng, Xiaoning, Hubei
 Chengbei Subdistrict, Changde, in Wuling District, Changde, Hunan
 Chengbei Subdistrict, Huaihua, in Hecheng District, Huaihua, Hunan
 Chengbei Subdistrict, Suzhou, in Gusu District (formerly Pingjiang District), Suzhou, Jiangsu
 Chengbei Subdistrict, Taizhou, Jiangsu, in Hailing District
 Chengbei Subdistrict, Xinyu, in Yushui District, Xinyu, Jiangxi
 Chengbei Subdistrict, Lüliang, in Lishi District, Lüliang, Shanxi
 Chengbei Subdistrict, Yongji, Shanxi
 Chengbei Subdistrict, Deyang, in Jingyang District, Deyang, Sichuan
 Chengbei Subdistrict, Mianyang, in Fucheng District, Mianyang, Sichuan
 Chengbei Subdistrict, Shigatse, Tibet
 Chengbei Subdistrict, Jinhua, in Wucheng District, Jinhua, Zhejiang
 Chengbei Subdistrict, Wenling, Zhejiang
 Chengbei Road Subdistrict, Shaoyang, in Daxiang District, Shaoyang, Hunan
 Chengbei Road Subdistrict, Zibo, in Zhoucun District, Zibo, Shandong
 Chengbei Subdistrict, Yarkant County, Kashgar Prefecture, Xinjiang

Villages
Chengbei, Wenquan, Yingshan County, Huanggang, Hubei